Min Bahadur Rayamajhi was a Nepalese judge who served as 19th Chief Justice of Nepal, in office from 8 May 2009 to 10 February 2010. He was appointed by the then-president of Nepal, Ram Baran Yadav.

He was preceded by Kedar Prasad Giri and succeeded by Anup Raj Sharma.

References 

Living people
Year of birth missing (living people)